Petter Hansson (born 16 May 1996) is a Swedish professional ice hockey defenceman. He is currently playing under contract with Herning Blue Fox in the Metal Ligaen (DEN). He was selected in the 7th round, 202nd overall, in the 2015 NHL Entry Draft by the New York Islanders.

Playing career
Hansson made his Swedish Hockey League debut playing with Linköpings HC during the 2014–15 SHL season. During the 2016–17 season, Hansson played 22 games for 1 assist with Linköpings HC while also appearing on loan with Västerviks IK in the Allsvenskan with 9 points in 28 games.

On May 23, 2017, Hansson left Linköpings HC and agreed to a two-year contract with Södertälje SK of the Allsvenskan. During the 2018-19 season, Hansson was briefly loaned to Huddinge IK in the Hockeyettan, returning to the Allsvenskan after 5 games.

Career statistics

References

External links

1996 births
Living people
Herning Blue Fox players
Huddinge IK players
EC KAC players
Linköping HC players
New York Islanders draft picks
IK Oskarshamn players
Södertälje SK players
Swedish ice hockey defencemen
Västerviks IK players
VIK Västerås HK players